Péter Veres (born 22 February 1979) is a Hungarian volleyball player. He was a member of Hungary men's national volleyball team in 2001–2008 and the Italian club LPR Piacenza. From 2019 to 2021, he managed the women's volleyball team at Fatum Nyregyháza.

Career

Clubs
Peter won the Best Receiver award for the 2010–11 CEV Champions League Final Four, also winning the bronze medal with VC Dynamo Moscow. In season 2013/2014 played for Asseco Resovia Rzeszów. He left club from Poland after winning silver medal of Polish Championship 2014.

Sporting achievements

Clubs

CEV Champions League
  2010/2011 - with VC Dynamo Moscow

CEV Cup
  2011/2012 - with VC Dynamo Moscow

National championships
 1997/1998  Hungarian Championship, with Nyíregyháza
 2003/2004  Spanish Championship, with Unicaja Almería
 2004/2005  Spanish Championship, with Unicaja Almería
 2010/2011  Russian Championship, with VC Dynamo Moscow
 2011/2012  Russian Championship, with VC Dynamo Moscow
 2013/2014  Polish SuperCup2013, with Asseco Resovia Rzeszów
 2013/2014  Polish Championship, with Asseco Resovia Rzeszów

Individually
 2011 CEV Champions League - Best Receiver

References

External links 
 League Volley Serie A player profile
 PlusLiga player profile
 Asseco Resovia Rzeszów player profile

1979 births
Living people
Volleyball players from Budapest
Hungarian men's volleyball players
Expatriate volleyball players in Italy
Hungarian expatriate sportspeople in Italy
Expatriate volleyball players in Spain
Hungarian expatriate sportspeople in Spain
Expatriate volleyball players in Qatar
Hungarian expatriate sportspeople in Qatar
Expatriate volleyball players in Russia
Hungarian expatriate sportspeople in Russia
Expatriate volleyball players in Poland
Hungarian expatriate sportspeople in Poland
Spanish Champions of men's volleyball
Resovia (volleyball) players
Ural Ufa volleyball players